Alasdair Elliott is a British operatic tenor. With The Royal Opera, Elliott sang the role of Emperor Altoum in Puccini's Turandot in 2014.

References

Living people
21st-century British male opera singers
English operatic tenors
Year of birth missing (living people)